Ahoada East (also spelt Ehuda East) is a Local Government Area of Rivers State, Nigeria, located northwest of Port Harcourt. Its seat is in the city of Ahoada. Towns in Ahoada East include Odiabidi.

References 

Local Government Areas in Rivers State
1996 establishments in Nigeria
1990s establishments in Rivers State